The 1973 Gael Linn Cup, the most important representative competition for elite level participants in the women's team field sport of camogie, was won by Connacht, who defeated Leinster in the final, played at Parnell Park.

Arrangements
Leinster defeated Ulster 4–3 to 3–4 at Naas but it was Connacht's year, with their inaugural inter-provincial title. First they drew with Munster at Castleconnell 3–7 to 4–4 after 20 minutes of extra-time. An all Galway side defeated an all-Cork Munster team at Ballinasloe by five points, 1–6 to 1–1, in a match described in the Connacht Tribune as a "one of the best exhibitions of the game for many a year". Connacht won the Gael-Linn Cup for the first time at Parnell Park. Two goals from Margaret Murphy and further goals from Nono McHugh, Phil Foye and a point from Jane Murphy secured their victory in the final by 4–4 to 3–3, a spell midway through the second half when they scored two quick goals having put them seven points clear.
Leinster had to field without their captain Liz Neary with Peggy Carey deputising on the wing and Rita White taking over as captain. 
Agnes Hourigan wrote in the Irish Press: Connacht won well and their superiority would have been emphasised, especially in the first half, but for some fine saves by the Leinster goalkeeper Anne Carey from Dublin. When Liz Neary came on in the second half in an effort to save the day, she made little impact on a game within Connacht's grasp.

Final stages

|}

References

External links
 Camogie Association

1973 in camogie
1973